Angelos Chaniotis (born  November 8, 1959) is a Greek historian and Classics scholar, known for original and wide-ranging research in the cultural, religious, legal and economic history of the Hellenistic period and the Roman East.  His research interests also include the history of Crete and Greek epigraphy.  Chaniotis is a Professor in the School of Historical Studies at the Institute for Advanced Study in Princeton.

He is a member of the German Archaeological Institute and was a member of the Editorial Board of the Classical Studies journal Mnemosyne.

Education and career
Chaniotis got his B.A. at the University of Athens in 1982.   He got his Ph.D. at Heidelberg University in 1984 and received habilitation at that same institution in 1992. He was a visiting professor at New York University in 1993–1998.  He was a visiting professor at Oxford University from 2010 to 2013 and senior research fellow at All Souls College, Oxford, from 2006 to 2010.  He taught at Heidelberg University from 1987 to 2006 and was the chair of that school's Department of Ancient History from 1998 to 2006.  In 2008 he joined the faculty as an ancient history and classics professor in the School of Historical Studies at the Institute for Advanced Study.

Chaniotis is the co-director of the Lyktos Archaeological Project.

Awards
In 2000 the German state of Baden-Württemberg awarded Chaniotis one of its State Research Prizes.  In 2015 the Alexander von Humboldt Foundation awarded him one of eleven Anneliese Maier Research Awards.  In 2014 the government of Greece awarded him the Commander's Cross of the Order of the Phoenix.

Works
 Age of Conquests: The Greek World from Alexander to Hadrian, London: Profile Books and Cambridge MA: Harvard University Press, 2018, 
 War in the Hellenistic World : a Social and Cultural History, Malden, MA : Oxford (Eng.) 2005, 
 Die Verträge zwischen kretischen Poleis in der hellenistischen Zeit, Stuttgart : Steiner, 1996,(habilitation thesis) 
 Das antike Kreta, München : Beck, 2004,  (In German)
 Historie und Historiker in den griechischen Inschriften : epigraphische Beiträge zur griechischen Historiographie, Steiner, Stuttgart, 1988, (doctoral dissertation)  (In German)
 Heidelberger Althistorische posts and Epigraphic Studies. Vol. 24, Steiner, Stuttgart 1996,

 Books edited
 Unveiling emotions. Vol. I: Sources and methods for the study of emotions in the Greek world, Stuttgart : F. Steiner, 2012, 
 Unveiling emotions. Vol. II: Sources and methods for the studEmotions in Greece and Rome: texts, images, material culture, Stuttgart : F. Steiner, 2012, 
 From Minoan farmers to Roman traders: sidelights on the economy of ancient Crete, Stuttgart : F. Steiner, 1999,

References

External links
 Home page of Angelos Chaniotis at the Institute for Advanced Study
 Home page of Angelos Chaniotis at All Souls College, Oxford
Papers of Angelos Chaniotis in Propylaeum-DOK A Digital Repository of Classical Studies maintained Heidelberg University Library
 Curriculum vitae of Angelos Chaniotis at the Institute for Advanced Study

21st-century Greek male writers
20th-century Greek historians
Institute for Advanced Study faculty
Academic staff of Heidelberg University
Fellows of All Souls College, Oxford
Heidelberg University alumni
National and Kapodistrian University of Athens alumni
Epigraphers
1959 births
Living people
Writers from Athens
Commanders of the Order of the Phoenix (Greece)
Members of the Finnish Academy of Science and Letters
21st-century Greek historians
Greek non-fiction writers
New York University faculty